Pambos Christofi (born 10 May 1968) is a retired Cypriot football midfielder.

References

1968 births
Living people
Cypriot footballers
Apollon Limassol FC players
Association football midfielders
Cypriot First Division players
Cyprus international footballers